Leptostylus angulicollis is a species of longhorn beetles of the subfamily Lamiinae. It was described by Henry Walter Bates in 1885, and is known from Guatemala and El Salvador.

References

Leptostylus
Beetles described in 1885